Ioan Coman (born 14 April 1908, date of death unknown) was a Romanian cross-country skier. He competed in the men's 18 kilometre event at the 1936 Winter Olympics.

References

1908 births
Year of death missing
Romanian male cross-country skiers
Olympic cross-country skiers of Romania
Cross-country skiers at the 1936 Winter Olympics
Place of birth missing